The Greek ironclad Vasilefs Georgios was an armored corvette built in Great Britain for the Royal Hellenic Navy during the 1860s. She became a cadet training ship before she was stricken from the Navy List in 1912. The ship was scrapped in 1915.

Description
The ship displaced . She had horizontal single-expansion steam engines that drove two propellers. For long-distance travel, Vasilefs Georgios was fitted with two masts and schooner rigged. The ship had a crew of 120 officers and crewmen.

Vasilefs Georgios was armed with a pair of Armstrong  rifled muzzle-loading guns. The ship was a central-battery ironclad with the armament concentrated amidships in a hexagonal armored citadel.

Construction and service
Vasilefs Georgios, named for King George I of Greece, was built by Thames Ironworks, Blackwall, London. She was launched on 28 December 1867 and completed the following year. In February 1870, Vasilefs Georgios was damaged at sea, guns in one of her turrets being dislodged. She put in to Lisbon, Portugal on 9 February for repairs, her crew refusing to proceed. The ship became a training ship for naval cadets around the end of the 19th century. She was stricken in 1912. Vasilefs Georgios was broken up in 1915.

Notes

Bibliography
 

 

Ironclad warships of the Hellenic Navy
Ships built by the Blackwall Yard
1867 ships
Maritime incidents in February 1870